Redox (reduction–oxidation reaction) is a chemical reaction in which the oxidation states of atoms are changed.

Redox may also refer to:

 Redox (operating system), an operating system written in the Rust programming language
 Redox Brands, a former company established in Ohio, US

See also
 Redox titration, a type of titration based on a redox reaction between the analyte and titrant